The 1971–72 season was Leeds United's eighth consecutive season in the Football League First Division, the top tier of English football, where they finished 2nd, one point behind winners Derby County. Alongside the First Division, the club competed in the FA Cup, Football League Cup and the UEFA Cup. Leeds won the FA Cup, beating Arsenal 1–0 in the final on 6 May 1972. They were eliminated from the Football League Cup in the third round and were knocked out of the UEFA Cup by Lierse S.K. in the first round.

Background
In March 1961, the club appointed former player Don Revie as manager, following the resignation of Jack Taylor. His stewardship began in adverse circumstances; the club was in financial difficulty and in 1961–62 only a win in the final game of the season saved the club from relegation to Division Three. Revie implemented a youth policy and a change of kit colour to an all-white strip in the style of Real Madrid, and Leeds soon won promotion to the First Division in 1963–64. Leeds adapted well to the First Division in the 1964–65 campaign, finishing second to rivals Manchester United on goal difference. It took the club until 1968 to win their first major honour, winning the League Cup with Terry Cooper scoring the only goal of a 1–0 victory in the final against Arsenal. They also won the 1968 Inter-Cities Fairs Cup Final, beating Hungarian club Ferencvárosi over two legs. Leeds won the first leg 1–0, and a month later defended their lead with a 0–0 draw in Budapest, before winning the First Division for the first time in the 1968–69 campaign.

Having rejected an offer to manage Birmingham City, Revie chose to remain at Leeds for the 1970–71 campaign. Leeds and Arsenal both challenged for the title that season, though it would be the Gunners who would claim the league title, finishing one point ahead of Leeds after the latter lost to West Bromwich Albion following a controversial offside goal. United were also knocked out of the FA Cup by Fourth Division side Colchester United. Leeds again found success in the Inter-Cities Fairs Cup though, beating Juventus in the final on away goals.

Season summary
As a result of the pitch invasion against West Bromwich Albion, Leeds were banned from playing their first five home games of the 1971–72 season at home, and only managed to pick up 2 points from those games. However, they still managed to mount a challenge for the Double; an Allan Clarke goal was enough as Leeds beat Arsenal 1–0 in the FA Cup Final, but once again heavy fixture congestion meant that Leeds had to play three crucial games within the space of one week; an away match against Chelsea in the league three days before the FA cup final and they had to play their final league game less than two days after the final, which was away to Wolves. Leeds only had to draw this game to win the title, but they were beaten. The league went to Derby County, again by 1 point. Eric Todd of the Guardian wrote on the situation in the week prior to these games: "If Leeds fail to win either the Cup or the League title they need not blame loss of form. They must blame the system. And if Leeds cannot field a full strength side against Arsenal at Wembley, the crowd can blame the Football League and Chelsea who have decided that their jaunt to the West Indies, or wherever it is, is more important than trying to help Leeds prepare properly for crucial football matches." In later years controversy surrounding the Wolves game would develop into a match-fixing scandal, with accusations directed towards Leeds United captain Billy Bremner. However Bremner would clear his name of these allegations in court, with evidence given for Bremner by Wolves's captain and forward Derek Dougan, who scored the winning goal in the match at Molineux.

Competitions

Football League First Division

League table

Matches

Source:

FA Cup

Source:

League Cup

Source:

UEFA Cup

Source:

Inter-Cities Fairs Cup Trophy play-off

Source:

Player statistics

Appearances and goals

Notes

References

Leeds United F.C. seasons
Leeds United F.C.
1970s in Leeds